Oshri Gita (born 2 July 1985) is an Israeli retired football player. During the 2007–08 season, with Maccabi Haifa Oshri's goal against Hapoel Petah Tikva during the 2006–07 season,  was ranked in the top ten goals of the season by Sport5. He holds a rather rare distinction in Israel, having run the fastest ten metre dash during tests at the Wingate Institute, beating the previous record held by Yakubu.

Footnotes

External links 
 Profile and statistics of Oshri Gita on One.co.il 

1985 births
Living people
Israeli Jews
Israeli footballers
Maccabi Haifa F.C. players
Hapoel Haifa F.C. players
Maccabi Ahi Nazareth F.C. players
Hapoel Ashkelon F.C. players
Hapoel Ra'anana A.F.C. players
Hapoel Nof HaGalil F.C. players
Hapoel Acre F.C. players
Hakoah Maccabi Amidar Ramat Gan F.C. players
Bnei Sakhnin F.C. players
Israeli Premier League players
Footballers from Tirat Carmel
Association football forwards